The National Science Center Kharkiv Institute of Physics and Technology (KIPT), formerly the Ukrainian Physics and Technology Institute (UPTI) is the oldest and largest physical science research centre in Ukraine. Today it is known as a science center as it consists of several institutes that are part of the Kharkiv Institute of Physics and Technology science complex.

History

The institute was founded on 30 October 1928, by the Government of Soviet Ukraine on an initiative of Abram Ioffe on the northern outskirts of Kharkiv (in khutir Piatykhatky) as the Ukrainian Institute of Physics and Technology for the purpose of research on nuclear physics and condensed matter physics.

From the moment of its creation, the institute was run by the People's Commissariat of Heavy Industry.

On 10 October 1932 the first experiments in nuclear fission in the Soviet Union were conducted here. The Soviet nuclear physicists Anton Valter, Georgiy Latyshev, Cyril Sinelnikov, and Aleksandr Leipunskii used a lithium atom nucleus. Later the Ukrainian Institute of Physics and Technology was able to obtain liquid hydrogen and helium. They also constructed a radar station, and the institute became a pioneer of the Soviet high vacuum engineering which was developed into an industrial vacuum metallurgy.

During Stalin's Great Terror in 1938, the institute suffered the so-called UPTI Affair: three leading physicists of the Kharkiv Institute (Lev Landau, Yuri Rumer and Moisey Korets) were arrested by the Soviet secret police.

The Ukrainian Institute of Physics and Technology was the "Laboratory no. 1" for nuclear physics, and was responsible for the first development of a nuclear bomb in the USSR.

It was damaged by shelling during the 2022 Russian invasion of Ukraine, resulting in heavy damage to the Neutron Source nuclear facility.

Directors
 1929 — 1933: Ivan Obreimov
 1933 — 1934: Aleksandr Leipunskii
 1934 — 1936: Semyon Davidovich
 1936 — 1938: Aleksandr Leipunskii
 1938 — 1941: Aleksandr Shpetny
 1944 — 1965: Cyril Sinelnikov
 1965 — 1980: Victor Ivanov
 1980 — 1996: Viktor Zelensky
 1996 — 2004: Vladimir Lapshin
 2004 — 2017: Ivan Neklyudov
 2017 — present: Nikolay Shulga

Important institutes
Science and education institutions in Pyatykhatky.

Kharkiv Institute of Physics and Technology
 The Lev Shubnikov Low Temperature Laboratory at the Ukrainian Institute of Physics and Technology was founded in 1931. Lev Shubnikov was a head of the cryogenic laboratory at the Ukrainian Physics and Technology Institute in 1931–1937. In 1935, Rjabinin, Schubnikow experimentally discovered the Type-II superconductors at the cryogenic laboratory at the institute.
 Institute of condensed matter physics, materials studies and technology
 Plasma physics institute, Institute of high energy and nuclear physics
 Institute of plasma electronics and new methods of acceleration
 Akhiezer Institute of theoretical physics

Other institutes
 Kharkiv University faculty of physics and technology, located nearby.

Notable alumni
Aleksander Akhiezer
Naum Akhiezer
Semion Braude
Dmitri Ivanenko
Fritz Houtermans
Arnold Kosevich
Eduard Kuraev
Igor Kurchatov
Lev Landau
Oleg Lavrentiev
Aleksandr Leipunskii
Ilya Lifshitz
Evgeny Lifshitz
Boris Podolsky
Isaak Pomeranchuk
Antonina Prikhot'ko
Lev Shubnikov
Cyril Sinelnikov
László Tisza

References

External links
 National Science Center, Kharkiv Institute of Physics and Technology
 
 Kharkiv Institute of Physics and Technology . National Academy of Sciences of Ukraine

Research institutes established in 1928
Nuclear research institutes
Science and technology in Ukraine
Research institutes in Kharkiv
Institutes of the National Academy of Sciences of Ukraine
Science centers
 
Kyivskyi District (Kharkiv)
Research institutes in the Soviet Union
People's Commissariat of Heavy Industry